Victor Steeman (15 June 2000 – 11 October 2022) was a Dutch motorcycle racer. He competed in the Supersport 300 World Championship intermittently from 2018 until 2022 when he died from his injuries from a crash at the first race of Portimão round of that season.

Biography

Supersport 300 World Championship
Born in Zevenaar, Steeman made his world debut in 2018 in the Supersport 300, participating in the last two Grand Prix of the 2018 season as a replacement driver. Riding the KTM RC 390 R, he scored his first world championship point, and ended in fifteenth position in the Portimão GP. The following season, he was brought in as a starting rider for the German team Freudenberg, riding a KTM. He had won first pole position in the Jerez GP, which allowed him to start in the lead in both races held during the grand prix. His best position during the season was in Donington with a fourth place finish. He ended the season in fifth place in the overall standings.

In 2020, Steeman competed in the German IDM championship in the 600 class. He won both races in Assen and finished the season in fifth position. Steeman then returned for the 2021 season, with Freudenberg riding a KTM. In the Most GP in the Czech Republic, Steeman had his second pole position and won his first race. He finished the season in tenth place in the standings.

Final season and death
In 2022, Steeman moved to the Dutch team MTM Kawasaki. In the Assen GP, he won his fourth pole position and his second career victory. He won three more races with the possibility of becoming the overall champion. In the final round on 8 October at the Algarve International Circuit, he suffered a very serious accident in the first race and thus did not finish and was ruled out of the second race. He finished second in the overall standings. Steeman died three days later on 11 October in a hospital in Faro due to injuries sustained from that accident. He was 22 years old and the second Supersport 300 rider to die from injuries in a race.

Two days after Steeman's death, his mother Flora van Limbeek died from a heart attack in Lathum, Zevenaar; she was 59 years old.

Career statistics

Supersport 300 World Championship

Races by year
(key) (Races in bold indicate pole position; races in italics indicate fastest lap)

References

2000 births
2022 deaths
People from Zevenaar
Dutch motorcycle racers
Supersport 300 World Championship riders
Motorcycle racers who died while racing
Filmed deaths in motorsport
Sport deaths in Portugal